British Bechuanaland was a short-lived Crown colony of the United Kingdom that existed in southern Africa from its formation on 30 September 1885 until its annexation to the neighbouring Cape Colony on 16 November 1895. Today the region forms part of South Africa.

History
Bechuanaland meant "the country of the Tswana", and for administrative purposes was divided into two political entities by the Molopo River. The northern part was administered as the Bechuanaland Protectorate, and the southern part was administered as the Crown colony of British Bechuanaland.

In 1882, the Tswana country suffered two secessions by the Boer states of Stellaland and Goshen. For many months, starting in 1883, pressure was placed on the British Government to take action in Bechuanaland because of unrest in the area. On 29 October 1884, the British Government appointed Sir Charles Warren as Special Commissioner of Bechuanaland. On 13 November 1884, Parliament voted a sum of £675,000 (this is equivalent to over £32 million today) for military operations in Bechuanaland. Sir Charles Warren was authorised to recruit an irregular force of 1,500 in South Africa in addition to the regular troops that would be provided.

A force of 4,000 troops, under Sir Charles Warren, set off to recapture Stellaland and Goshen. On 7 February 1885 the force reached Vryburg, the principal town in Stellaland, then continued to the hamlet of Rooigrond, the administrative centre of Goshen. Just north of Rooigrond the town of Mafeking was laid out as an administrative centre. By 8 April 1885, Sir Charles Warren sent a dispatch to notify the British Government that he had occupied Bechuanaland and had entirely restored order. The two Boer republics had collapsed without any bloodshed.

On 30 September 1885, Stellaland, Goshen and other territories to the south of the Molopo and Nossob rivers (excluding Griqualand West) were constituted as the Crown Colony of British Bechuanaland. In 1891, the South African Customs Union was extended to British Bechuanaland, and, in 1895, the colony was annexed to the Cape Colony and now forms part of South Africa, the area around Mafikeng.

See also
History of South Africa
Bechuanaland Protectorate, the northern part of Bechuanaland that now forms the Republic of Botswana.
Postage stamps and postal history of British Bechuanaland

References

History of South Africa
Former countries in Africa
States and territories established in 1885
Former colonies in Africa
Cape Colony
1885 establishments in the British Empire
1895 disestablishments in the British Empire